Vares is a surname. In Estonian language and some dialects of Finnish the word literally means "raven". Notable people with the surname include:
 Johannes Vares (1890–1946), Estonian politician
 Maria Eulália Vares, Brazilian mathematical statistician and probability theorist
 Sergo Vares (born 1982), Estonian actor
 Tõnis Vares (1859–1925), Estonian politician

Fictional characters
Jussi Vares, fictional Finnish private detective from the novel series Vares by  Reijo Mäki and films base on the novels

See also

Suzanne Vares-Lum
Abdel Vares Sharraf
Varis, Finnish surname of the same meaning

Estonian-language surnames
Surnames from nicknames